Criorhina villosa is a species of hoverfly in the family Syrphidae, formerly placed into its own genus, Merapioidus.

Distribution
United States.

References

Eristalinae
Insects described in 1879
Diptera of North America
Taxa named by Jacques-Marie-Frangile Bigot